Flavigny may refer to:

Places

France
 Flavigny, Cher, in the Cher département
 Flavigny, Marne, in the Marne département
 Flavigny-le-Grand-et-Beaurain, in the Aisne département
 Flavigny-sur-Moselle, in the Meurthe-et-Moselle département
 Flavigny-sur-Ozerain, in the Côte-d'Or département
 Flavigny Abbey, a Dominican (formerly Benedictine) monastery in Flavigny-sur-Ozerain

Food
 Anise of Flavigny, an anise flavored pastille from France

People with the surname
 Hugh of Flavigny (c. 1064-1140), Benedictine abbot and historian